Deathbolt is a supervillain appearing in American comic books published by DC Comics. He was created by the Ultra-Humanite to fight the All-Star Squadron.

Deathbolt made his first live appearance in the third season of the Arrowverse television series Arrow played by actor Doug Jones. Deathbolt also reappeared in an episode of the first season of The Flash as well.

Fictional character biography
Wanted for murder, Jake Simmons fled police in a stolen biplane during a heavy storm. He crashed when lightning struck the plane over Meteor Crater, Arizona. The Ultra-Humanite found him and experimented on him until his body became a living electrical battery. Code-named "Deathbolt", he became the Ultra-Humanite's staunch ally until his defeat by the All-Star Squadron.

Deathbolt (or a successor) returned in recent years and tried to kill the late Starman, Ted Knight only to be thwarted by the arrival of Ted's descendant Farris Knight.

Powers and abilities
Deathbolt can channel the electrical energy in his body into powerful blasts of electricity.

In other media
Doug Jones portrayed a version of Deathbolt in the live-action television series, Arrow, in the season three episode "Broken Arrow". Significantly, he was the first metahuman villain to appear on the series, with the ability to control and shoot plasma. By the end of the episode, it was revealed that he did not receive his powers from the particle accelerator explosion at Central City - as he was in prison in Opal City on the night of the explosion - but from another unknown means, widening the possibilities of how metahumans come about in the Arrowverse.

Deathbolt also appears as one of the villains in The Flash episode "Rogue Air", portrayed again by Doug Jones. As he was about to kill The Flash, he is himself killed by Captain Cold because in Cold's own words said: "He owed me money".

References

Comics characters introduced in 1983
DC Comics supervillains
DC Comics metahumans
Characters created by Roy Thomas
Characters created by Jerry Ordway
Fictional characters with electric or magnetic abilities